The Tracks of Sweeney is an album by Sweeney's Men. It was first released in 1969 and re-released on CD in 1996, packaged together with Sweeney's Men.  One track on this album is frequently anthologised: "Hall of Mirrors".

Track listing
"Dreams For Me" (Terry Woods)
"The Pipe On The Hob" (instr) (Trad)
"Brain Jam" (Terry Woods)
"Pretty Polly" (Trad)
"Standing On The Shore" (Trad)
"A Mistake No Doubt" (Henry McCullagh/ Terry Woods)
"Go By Brooks" (Leonard Cohen)
"When You Don't Care For Me" (Terry Woods)
"Afterthoughts" (Terry Woods)
"Hiram Hubbard" (Trad)
"Hall Of Mirrors" (Henry McCullagh)

Personnel
Johnny Moynihan - vocal, bouzouki, tin whistle
Terry Woods - vocals, 6-string guitar, 12-string guitar, banjo, concertina

1969 albums
Sweeney's Men albums
Transatlantic Records albums